Meiogyne is a genus of flowering plants with about 33 species belonging to the family Annonaceae. It is native from southwestern India and Indochina to Australia, including Fiji and New Caledonia.

Description 
Trees or shrubs with pale straw coloured twigs. Leaves membraneous and with prominent veins. Flowers axillary, medium to large. Sepals 3, valvate, connate at base. Petals 6, valvate in two series, tapering gradually from a broad base upward and diverging, densely tomentose or sericeous-tomentose. The inner petals are slightly shorted in length with a warted patch at base inside. Stamens numerous with flat-topped slightly oblique connective tissue, concealing the anther lobes with viewed from above. Torus convex. Ovaries 2 to 5 with several ovules in two rows. Stigma discoid, sessile. Carpels thick-walled, sessile or sub-sessile.

Meiogyne is different from Cyathocalyx in several ways. The leaf texture is different. Flowers are axillary and not extra-axillary or leaf-opposed. Arrangement of the petals is diverging from a broad base and not clawed and constricted and the base is not adpressed over the stamens. The warted base of the inner petal is peculiar. The stamens and stigmas are similar to Cyathocalyx. Meiogyne is similar to Polyalthia in its spreading petals and similarity of stamens, but the large number of seeds and sessile, discoid stigma are distinguishing features.

Species 
 Plants of the World Online includes the following 33 species:

 Meiogyne amicorum 
 Meiogyne amygdalina 
 Meiogyne anomalocarpa 
 Meiogyne baillonii 
 Meiogyne beccarii 
 Meiogyne bidwillii 
 Meiogyne caudata 
 Meiogyne chiangraiensis 
 Meiogyne cylindrocarpa 
 Meiogyne dumetosa 
 Meiogyne gardneri 
 Meiogyne glabra 
 Meiogyne habrotricha 
 Meiogyne heteropetala 
 Meiogyne hirsuta 
 Meiogyne insularis 
 Meiogyne kanthanensis 
 Meiogyne laddiana 
 Meiogyne lecardii 
 Meiogyne leptoneura 
 Meiogyne maxiflora 
 Meiogyne microflora 
 Meiogyne mindorensis 
 Meiogyne monosperma 
 Meiogyne oligocarpa 
 Meiogyne pannosa 
 Meiogyne papuana 
 Meiogyne punctulata 
 Meiogyne ramarowii 
 Meiogyne stenopetala 
 Meiogyne trichocarpa 
 Meiogyne verrucosa 
 Meiogyne virgata  - type species (Indochina, western Malesia including the Philippines)

References 

Annonaceae genera
Taxa named by Friedrich Anton Wilhelm Miquel